Ivan Elmore Brown (April 17, 1908 – May 22, 1963) was an American bobsledder who competed in the 1930s. He won the gold medal in the two-man event at the 1936 Winter Olympics in Garmisch-Partenkirchen.

References
Bobsleigh two-man Olympic medalists 1932-56 and since 1964

1908 births
1963 deaths
American male bobsledders
Bobsledders at the 1936 Winter Olympics
Olympic gold medalists for the United States in bobsleigh
Medalists at the 1936 Winter Olympics